Chiloglottis truncata, commonly known as the small ant orchid, is a small species of orchid endemic to Queensland. It has two leaves and a single green flower with a shiny black, insect-like callus occupying most of the labellum.

Description
Flowering occurs from July to September.

Taxonomy and naming
Chiloglottis truncata was first formally described in 1987 by David Jones and Mark Clements from a specimen collected at Anduramba and the description was published in Proceedings of the Royal Society of Queensland. The specific epithet (truncata) is a Latin word meaning "shorten by cutting off".

Distribution and habitat
The small ant orchid grows in forest and woodland between Kingaroy and Toowoomba.

References

External links 

truncata
Orchids of New South Wales
Orchids of Queensland
Plants described in 1987